The Lion Foundation Cup is the women's equivalent to the Air New Zealand Cup. It is a provincial championship contested between women's rugby union teams.

History
In 1990 the JJ Stewart Trophy (women's rugby's equivalent of the Ranfurly Shield) was started up for women's provincial teams. The NZRFU then formed a sub-committee to look after New Zealand's future at international level, a year after an unofficial New Zealand XV had played and beaten the California Grizzlies. The first women's national team attended the inaugural Women's Rugby World Cup in 1991 in Wales. The squad had to paid their own way to get to the tournament and attended without the blessing of the NZRFU but they went on to beat Canada and Wales to reach the semi-finals where they lost the United States 7-0 who were the eventual champions. It was another 10 years before the New Zealand women tasted defeat for a second time. That squad was selected off the back of an ever-strengthening Women's National Provincial Championship, which has grown to a 20-team competition after starting with 14 sides in 1999. The NPC and second-tier regional competitions have lifted the standard of women's rugby throughout the country. Not only is the women's NPC helping to battle harden the country's best players, it has also played a critical role in the development of the game among girls. The competition's growth is being mirrored by a rise in the number of girls taking up the game at school level.

References
All Blacks Website

New Zealand rugby union competitions